is a Japanese manga series written by LINK and illustrated by SAVAN. It is related to the World's End Harem series. The manga originally started in Shueisha's Ultra Jump in April 2018 and was transferred to the Shōnen Jump+ digital magazine in March 2022. It was also being published simultaneously on the Shōnen Jump+ digital magazine and Young Jump! app. Seven Seas Entertainment licensed the manga and its spin-off for an English release under its Ghost Ship imprint for mature readers.

Premise
Ark is the young prince and heir to the throne of the small Kingdom of Nargala. Under the mentorship of the female knight Celine, he studies the way of the pen and the sword. One day, he is forcibly separated from his childhood love, Aurelia Isteshia, after she was chosen to be part of the harem of the Empire's leader. Determined to get her back, Ark stumbles upon a mysterious dark elf named Latiforiazhard who helps Ark undergo a powerful transformation. With his newfound power, Ark sets off on a journey with Latiforiazhard in order to fix the wrongs of the world.

Publication
World's End Harem: Fantasia, written by LINK and illustrated by SAVAN, started in Shueisha's Ultra Jump on April 19, 2018, being also published on the Shōnen Jump+ digital magazine and Young Jump! app; the series finished in Ultra Jump on February 19, 2022, continuing digitally only. Seven Seas Entertainment licensed the manga for an English language release under its Ghost Ship imprint for mature readers.

A spin-off series, titled  and featuring characters in modern-day school setting, started in Ultra Jump on May 19, 2020; it also started on Shōnen Jump+ on August 2 of the same year. The series finished in Ultra Jump on February 19, 2022, continuing only on Shōnen Jump+. The series finished on July 17, 2022. Its first volume was released on January 4, 2021. The spin-off series is also licensed by Seven Seas under its Ghost Ship imprint for mature readers.

Volume list

Fantasia Academy

Reception
As of December 2018, the manga had 100,000 copies in circulation.

See also
 List of harem anime and manga

References

External links
  
 

Dark fantasy anime and manga
Harem anime and manga
Seinen manga
Seven Seas Entertainment titles
Shueisha manga
Sword and sorcery anime and manga